Polini is a surname. It is the name of:
Marcella Hazan (née Polini, 1924–2013), Italian cooking writer
Polini, character in 1944 western film Arizona Whirlwind
André Polini, Brazilian bicyclist, silver medalist at 2002 Pan American Road and Track Championships
Battista Polini, founder of motorcycle parts company Polini
Bella Polini, actress in 1922 German silent film Morass
Claudia Polini, Italian-American mathematician
Emélie Polini (1881–1927), English-Australian stage actress
Marino Polini (born 1959), Italian bicyclist